"Come Alive" is a song by Belgian drum and bass producer Netsky. The song was released on 21 May 2012 as a digital download in the United Kingdom from his second album 2. The single peaked at number 150 on the UK Singles Chart, number 24 on the UK Dance Chart and number 17 on the UK Indie Chart. The song was written and produced by Boris Daenen and features vocals from Scarlett Quinn.

Music video
A music video to accompany the release of "Come Alive" was first released onto YouTube on May 3, 2012 at a total length of three minutes and ten seconds.

Track listings

Chart performance

Release history

References

2012 singles
Netsky (musician) songs
2011 songs